John Gagliardi (November 1, 1926 – October 7, 2018) was an American football coach. He was the head football coach at Saint John's University in Collegeville, Minnesota, from 1953 until 2012.  From 1949 to 1952, he was the head football coach at Carroll College in Helena, Montana.  With a career record of 489–138–11, Gagliardi has the most wins of any coach in college football history. His Saint John's Johnnies teams won four national titles: the NAIA Football National Championship in 1963 and 1965, and the NCAA Division III Football Championship in 1976 and 2003.  Gagliardi was inducted into the College Football Hall of Fame in 2006.

Early life
John Gagliardi was born to Ventura and Antonietta Gagliardi in Trinidad, Colorado, in 1926. He began coaching football at Trinidad Catholic High School in 1943, at the age of 16, when his high school coach was called into service during World War II. He was a player-coach his senior year of high school and continued to coach high school football at St. Mary's High School while obtaining his college degree at Colorado College in Colorado Springs.

College coaching career
At the age of 22, with six years of high school coaching, Gagliardi was hired at Carroll College in Helena, Montana. In four seasons as head coach at Carroll, Gagliardi compiled a 24–6–1 record, winning three Montana Collegiate Conference championships.  After the 1952 season, Gagliardi left Carroll for Saint John's University in Collegeville, Minnesota.

Pro Football Hall of Fame player Johnny "Blood" McNally coached football at St. John's from 1950 to 1952. On leaving the job he said "Nobody can win at St. John's."

In 60 seasons coaching the Saint John's Johnnies, Gagliardi won a school and conference record 27 Minnesota Intercollegiate Athletic Conference (MIAC) titles and four national championships: in 1963 (at the Camellia Bowl),
1965, 1976, and 2003.  His record at Saint John's was 465–132–10, bringing his career college football mark to 489–138–11.

On November 8, 2003, Gagliardi broke the record for career coaching wins with his 409th victory, passing Grambling State's Eddie Robinson.  The 13,107 fans who witnessed the victory over Bethel at Saint John's Clemens Stadium were the largest crowd in NCAA Division III history.  The win also gave Saint John's its 23rd MIAC championship and an automatic berth in the NCAA Division III playoffs. The Johnnies went on to win the national championship with a 24–6 victory over Mount Union.

In 1993, Jostens and the J Club of St. John's University began awarding the Gagliardi Trophy annually to the most outstanding player in NCAA Division III.  On August 11, 2006, Gagliardi and Florida State's Bobby Bowden became the first active head coaches to be enshrined in the College Football Hall of Fame. (Nevada's Chris Ault had been inducted in 2002 and returned to coaching two years later.)

Gagliardi was known for his unique coaching approach, which he called "Winning with No's."  He instructed his players not to call him "coach", did not use a whistle or blocking sleds, prohibited tackling in practices, did not require his players to lift weights, and limited his team practices to 90 minutes.

Gagliardi announced his retirement from coaching on November 19, 2012. Gagliardi died on October 7, 2018, at the age of 91.

Awards
In 2003, Gagliardi received the Amos Alonzo Stagg Coaching Award from the United States Sports Academy. He won the 2007 Liberty Mutual Division III Coach of the Year. In 2009, Gagliardi won the Amos Alonzo Stagg Award from the American Football Coaches Association. Gagliardi received the National College Football Awards Association's (NCFAA) Contributions to College Football Award in 2013. He was inducted into the National Association of Collegiate Directors of Athletics Hall of Fame in 2006, the Colorado Sports Hall of Fame in 2015, and Saint John's University's J-Club Hall of Honor in 2018.

Head coaching record

College football

See also
 List of college football coaches with 200 wins
 List of college football coaches with 30 seasons

Further reading

References

External links
 Saint John's profile
 
 

1926 births
2018 deaths
Carroll Fighting Saints athletic directors
Carroll Fighting Saints football coaches
Carroll Fighting Saints men's basketball coaches
Saint John's Johnnies athletic directors
Saint John's Johnnies football coaches
Saint John's Johnnies men's ice hockey coaches
High school football coaches in Colorado
College Football Hall of Fame inductees
Colorado College alumni
People from Trinidad, Colorado
Coaches of American football from Colorado
Basketball coaches from Colorado